The Lady in Dignity is a South Korean television series starring Kim Hee-sun, Kim Sun-ah, Jung Sang-hoon with Lee Tae-im and Lee Ki-woo. The series aired on cable network JTBC on Fridays and Saturdays at 23:00 (KST) time slot from June 16 to August 19, 2017. It became one of the highest-rated Korean dramas in cable television history.

Synopsis
The story of an elegant Cheongdam-dong woman named Woo Ah-jin (Kim Hee-sun),  who relished a life of luxury by marrying a quasi-chaebol son, until Park Bok-ja (Kim Sun-ah) walks into her life.

Cast

Main
 Kim Hee-sun as Woo Ah-jin
 A cheerful, elegant and charismatic woman who married into a rich family, but hit rock bottom after her husband's betrayal.  
 Kim Sun-a as Park Bok-ja 
 A cool and unfazeable woman who climbs her way up the social totem pole despite coming from a small village.
 Jung Sang-hoon as Ahn Jae-suk
 Youngest son of Ahn Tae-dong and also Ah-jin's cheating husband. 
 Lee Tae-im as Yoon Sung-hee
 Ji-hoo's sexy art teacher who is overwhelmed with greed for fame and honor. She betrays Ah-jin who helped her into the art world and cheats with her husband Jae-suk.
 Lee Ki-woo as Kang Ki-ho 
 A coma patient turned lawyer. He had feeling toward Ah-jin and willing to help her either with her father-in-law's business or her divorce process

Supporting

People around Ah-jin
 Yoo Seo-jin as Cha Ki-ok
 Lee Hee-jin as Kim Hyo-joo
 Jung Da-hye as Oh Kyung-hee
 Oh Yeon-ah as Baek Joo-kyung
 Moon Hee-kyung as Madam Geum
 Choi Yoon-so as Heo Jin-hee

People around Jae-suk
 Kim Yong-gun as Ahn Tae-dong
 Seo Jeong-yeon as Park Joo-mi
 Han Jae-young as Ahn Jae-goo
 Oh Na-ra as Ahn Jae-hee
 Yoon Sa-bong as Yoon-su
 Lee Chae-mi as Ahn Ji-hoo

Extended

 Song Young-gyu as Jang Sung-soo
 Kim Bub-rae as Seo Moon-tak
 Chae Dong-hyun as Kim Bong-shik
 Hwang Hyo-eun as Chun Bang-soon
 Jo Sung-yoon as Goo Bong-chul
 Lee Jung-eun as Gook Sun-young
 Song Tae-yoon as Choi Ki-seok
 Seo Kyung-hwa as Mrs. Jo
 Lee Geon-woo as Ahn Woon-kyu
 Yoon Ye-in as Kyung San-daek
 So Hee-jung as Oh Poong-sook
 Park Jin-woo as Head of Department Park
 Lee Young-hoon as Mr. Kim
 Lee Kan-hee as Madam Kwak
 Kim Sun-bin as Han Min-ki
 Baek Seung-hoon as Bodyguard
 Baek Bo-ram as Se-hee
 Jeon Soo-kyeong as Director Seo
 Jun Hun-tae as Detective Lee
 Park Hoon

Special appearances
 Ryu Seung-soo as Ah-jin's father 
 Jung Yu-mi as Client (Episode 6)
 Yoon So-yi as Fishmonger (Episode 20)

Original soundtrack

Part 1

Part 2

Part 3

Part 4

Part 5

Part 6

Part 7

Part 8

Part 9

Reception
The Lady in Dignity is one of JTBC's highest rated drama with a single episode rating of 12.065%.
Culture critic Jung Duk-hyun says that the drama is not just a soap opera about couples' affairs, but a "social drama" where the two women's confrontation symbolizes the power and class structures of the society.

Due to its popularity, JTBC did a rerun of the series from October 2–6, 2017 with four-episode marathon per day starting from 7:00 (KST).

Ratings
In this table,  represent the lowest ratings and  represent the highest ratings.

Awards and nominations

References

External links
  
 
 

JTBC television dramas
Korean-language television shows
South Korean comedy-drama television series
2017 South Korean television series debuts
2017 South Korean television series endings
South Korean pre-produced television series
Television series by JS Pictures
Television series by Drama House